Zagórz  is a town in Sanok County, Subcarpathian Voivodeship, Poland, on the river Osława in the Bukowsko Upland mountains, located  south-east of Sanok on the way to Ustrzyki Dolne,  distance. The nearest towns in northeastern Slovakia are Palota and Medzilaborce. Zagórz has a population of 4,988 (02.06.2009).

Zagórz is the most southeasterly railroad junction of the PKP, with lines going into three directions - eastwards (to Krościenko and Ukrainian border), southwards (to Nowy Łupków and Slovak border) and westwards (to Jasło and the rest of the country).

History 
The village of Zagórz was established in the 14th century, when Red Ruthenia was annexed by the Kingdom of Poland. In early 16th-century documents, its name was spelled Sagorsze and Sogorsch. Zagorz belonged to the noble Tarnawski family, but in 1490, the village was sold to Piotr Kmita Sobienski. In the 16th and 17th centuries, Zagórz frequently changed owners.

In 1710, Voivode of Volhynia, Count Jan Adam Stadnicki built in Zagórz a fortified Carmelite monastery, which also served as a hospital for war veterans. The complex served as a hideout for rebels of the Bar Confederation, and in 1789, when Zagórz already belonged to Austrian Galicia (see Partitions of Poland), the abbey was closed by Joseph II, Holy Roman Emperor. In 1830, the complex burned in a fire.

In 1880, the population of Zagórz was 1,639, including Poles, "Rusyny" (Ukrainians), Jews and Germans. By that time, Zagorz already had a rail station, located in the district of Nowy Zagorz. The establishment of a rail junction contributed to the development of the village, whose population grew to 2,400 (in the year 1914). During the Polish–Ukrainian War (1918-1919), local rail workers built the armoured train Gromobój, which protected the area from Ukrainian raids.

In the Second Polish Republic, Zagorz belonged to Lwow Voivodeship. On September 12, 1939, the first Wehrmacht units entered the village.. During the war, a Home Army unit operated in the area of the village. German occupation ended on September 13, 1944, when the Red Army entered Zagorz.

During World War II dzielnica Zasław of the town Zagórz was the location of Zasław concentration camp set up by Nazi Germany for the concentration and exploitation of Polish Jews soon to be exterminated in Belzec.

Points of interest

References

Bibliography
 Prof. Adam Fastnacht.  Slownik Historyczno-Geograficzny Ziemi Sanockiej w Średniowieczu (Historic-Geographic Dictionary of the Sanok District in the Middle Ages), Kraków, 2002, .

External links
Zagórz – Official webpage

Cities and towns in Podkarpackie Voivodeship
Sanok County
Holocaust locations in Poland